Milford and Brocton railway station served the villages of Milford and Brocton in Staffordshire, England from 1877 to 1950 on the Trent Valley line.

History 
The station opened on 18 May 1877 by the London and North Western Railway. The station closed to both passengers and goods traffic on 6 March 1950.

References

External links 

Disused railway stations in Staffordshire
Railway stations in Great Britain opened in 1877
Railway stations in Great Britain closed in 1950
Former London and North Western Railway stations
1877 establishments in England